Established in 1961, the Ministry of Justice has gone by various names which have included Ministry of Internal Affairs and Justice (1965-1973), Ministry of Justice and Legal Affairs (1973-2000), and Ministry of Justice and Institutional Reforms (2000-2003). As of September 2007, per the Prime Minister's Order 18/03, the Ministry of Justice (Rwanda) was merged with the Office of the Attorney General. The ministry's main objectives include promoting statutory law, overseeing national legislation, and regulating law enforcement sectors.

List of ministers 

 Anastase Makuza (1961-1963) [1st Minister of Justice]
Gaspard Cyimana (1963) [Interim Minister of Justice]
Callixte Habamenshi (1963-1965)
Issoufou Saidou-Djermakoye (1965)
Gaspard Harelimana(1966-1969)
Andre Sebatware (1970-1974)
Bonaventure Habimana (1974-1978)
Charles Nkurunziza (1978-1984)
Jean Marie Vianney Mugemana (1984-1989)
Theoneste Mujyanama (1990-1991)
Sylvestre Nsanzimana (1991-1992)
Stanislas Mbonampeka (1992-1993)
Agnès Ntamabyaliro Rutagwera (1993-1994) [1st female]
Alphonse-Marie Nkubito (1994-1995)
Marthe Mukamurenzi (1995-1996) 
Faustin Nteziryayo (1996-1999)
Jean de Dieu Mucyo (1999-2003)
Edda Mukabagwiza (2003-2006) 
Tharcisse Karugarama (2007-2013)
 Johnston Businye (2013–present)

See also 

 Justice ministry
 Politics of Rwanda

References 

Rwanda
Government of Rwanda
Rwanda
1961 establishments in Rwanda